Mari-Meneuz (Mari-Mänäwez) is a rural locality (a village) in Bazitamaksky Selsoviet, Ilishevsky District, Bashkortostan, Russia. The population was 201 as of 2010. There is 1 street.

Geography 
Mari-Meneuz is located 37 km northeast of Verkhneyarkeyevo (the district's administrative centre) by road. Bazitamak is the nearest rural locality.

References 

Rural localities in Ilishevsky District